Eagle (also "Uwchland", "Windsor" or the "Village of Eagle") is an unincorporated community and census-designated place in Upper Uwchlan Township, Chester County, Pennsylvania. As of 2020, Eagle had a population of 498.  

Eagle has recently experienced tremendous development in the surrounding areas. A bypass of Route 100 was constructed in the first decade of the 2000s to reduce traffic and preserve historic structures such as the Eagle Tavern.

Gallery

References

External links

Unincorporated communities in Chester County, Pennsylvania
Unincorporated communities in Pennsylvania